Main building of Tartu University is the main building of the University of Tartu. This building is one of the most notable examples of classical style in Estonia.

Built between 1804 and 1809, it was designed by the architect Johann Wilhelm Krause.

The building has been restored many times, including after a fire in 1965, and most recently in 2007.

It features a large auditorium, as well as lock-up rooms in the attic used during the 19th century to detain students as punishment.

References

External links

Buildings and structures in Tartu
University of Tartu